Yevseyevskaya is a rural locality (a village) in Tarnogskoye Rural Settlement, Tarnogsky District, Vologda Oblast, Russia. The population was 50 as of 2002.

Geography 
Yevseyevskaya is located 15 km northeast of Tarnogsky Gorodok (the district's administrative centre) by road. Stepanovskaya is the nearest rural locality.

References 

Rural localities in Tarnogsky District